Amram is a biblical character.

Amram may also refer to:

People

Given name
 Amram of Mainz, legendary medieval German rabbi
 Amram Aburbeh, Sephardi chief rabbi of Petah Tikva, Israel
 Amram Gaon, 9th-century Jewish Babylonian sage
 Amram Zaks, Israeli rabbi

Surname

 David Werner Amram (1866-1939), American lawyer and legal scholar
 Philip Werner Amram (1900-1990), American lawyer and legal scholar
 Itubwa Amram (1922-1989), Nauruan pastor and politician
 David Amram (born 1930), an American composer and conductor
 Aharon Amram (born 1939), Israeli musician and poet
 Ofir Amram (born 1986), Israeli footballer
 Megan Amram (born 1987), American comedian and writer

Other uses
 AIM-120 AMRAAM, an air-to-air guided missile

See also
Visions of Amram, fragmentary manuscripts